Mattias Carlsson is a Swedish professional ice hockey winger who currently plays for Djurgårdens IF of the Elitserien. Carlsson previously played for Elitserien rivals Linköpings HC and Södertälje SK.

References

External links

Living people
Djurgårdens IF Hockey players
Södertälje SK players
1980 births
Swedish ice hockey forwards
People from Nyköping Municipality
Sportspeople from Södermanland County